The English Series were Philippine banknotes and coins that circulated from 1949 to 1969. It was the first banknote and coin series of the newly established Central Bank of the Philippines and was the only banknote and coin series of the Philippine peso to use English as its language for all of its banknotes and coins.

Banknotes

Coins

References

Philippines currency history
Banknotes of the Philippines